Al-Fateh is a professional basketball club based in Al-Hasa in Saudi Arabia's Eastern Province. The team won the Saudi Premier League championship for the first time in 2013–14. The following season, they finished runners-up to Ohud Medina and won the Prince Faisal Cup.

Achievements
Saudi Arabia Premier League champion: 2014.
Saudi Arabia Prince Faisal bin Fahad Cup winner: 2015, 2016.

Notable players

  Glen Rice Jr.

References

External links
Team profile at Asia-Basket.com

Basketball teams established in 1958
Basketball teams in Saudi Arabia
Sport in Al-Ahsa Governorate